Match fixing in Romanian football is called blat (plural blaturi).

This term is specifically used in the football domestic competition called Liga I to explain a friendly agreement between two or more presidents of football clubs for fixing matches. Etymologically blat means "dough" and a term for designing clandestine travelling in a city bus (has no plural form).
So a blătar fixes matches and a blatist travels without a bus ticket.

Origin
Blats are more related to the period before the Romanian Revolution of 1989.
The Communist local and central administration had a decisive role in designating the teams who will play in the next season in the first division.
Hence presidents agreed to help each other to avoid relegation from the first division.
This informal and dirty association was called cooperativa (first used in 1992 by former international footballer and current football analyst Cornel Dinu from a term which designated the Communist system of agricultural common association) and was composed by 3 or maximum 5 influential presidents.
In 1995 Dumitru Dragomir, a former president of Victoria Bucarest football team and the current long-serving president of the domestic league LPF admitted during a televised debate to being formerly involved in such deals.

Blat is also used by a term of "reciprocity" where two football chiefs accept that each of their team to win their home match in a direct confrontation of domestic champion round.

In the 1990s
After Communism collapsed the phenomenon of Blat was related to the development of informal economy. The media raised awareness about such apparent dealings though thus far never leading to serious investigations for corruption.
Many football club owners, especially outside Bucharest, agreed to create an informal association between 3 or 5 owners with the aim of helping each other and involved other teams to join this "gang".
That method consist in letting each of the involved teams to win the home matches, accepting to lose the away matches.
The most prolific football club chief who was the creator of this cartel is Jean Padureanu (also known as The Lord), president of Gloria Bistriţa, also known in the Romanian media as the Father of Blaturi.
The list includes Gheorghe Ştefan (also known as Pinalti), president of Ceahlăul Piatra Neamţ, and Romeo Paşcu (also known as Breakdance), president of FC Brașov.
Cornel Dinu also named DIVIZIA A as "championship of Jenel(Padureanu), Romel(Pascu)and Fanel(Stefan)" because these three chiefs had more influence in the decision of results.
During 1999 and 2001 the team of Rocar owned by former Securitate officer and Ceauşescu bodyguard Gheorghe (Gigi) Netoiu was named as "champion of blaturi" in local media.

The period between 1992 and 2002  has been described by some as the "blat" era of Romanian football. After this period the Liga 1 clubs saw some of the poorest results for Romanian teams in European Competitions.

Press campaign for eradication
During these years there was no punitive measure taken by central football authority organisms like FRF (the Romanian Football Federation) or LPF (the Romanian Professional Football League) to stop it.
After the Romanian football was ranked as the cheapest and one of the less spectacular championships in the world, new club owners took the decision to remove their clubs from such agreements with the potential of playing competitively again.
In 2003 after losing qualification for the second final football tournament, the president of the club FCM Bacău Dumitru Sechelariu admitted on a live football talk show equally that he was strongly involved in fixed matches and that there was an association of two or three presidents who did the same, proposing to stop these practice.
This was a turning and a decisive point in the eradication of the blat policy.
After that, the number of fixed matches decreased and many domestic championship results were again the consequence of fair matches.
The press admitted that competitive run during the 2005-2006 European of Romanian teams was a normal consequence of eradication of blaturi due to a strong and long anti-blat campaign.

See also
Football in Romania
2011 Turkish football corruption scandal

References

Football in Romania
Romanian football
Association football controversies
Crime in Romania